Rostron is a surname. Notable people with the surname include:

 Arthur Rostron (1869–1940), master of the ocean liner RMS Carpathia
 Kim Rostron (born 1974), English amateur golfer
 Sidney Nowell Rostron (1883–1948), Church of England priest, theologian, and academic
 Thurston Rostron, English footballer
 Wilf Rostron (born 1956), English footballer